Diethard Zils O.P. (born 1935) is a German Dominican, priest and hymnwriter.

Born in Bottrop, Zils is known as a hymnwriter for the genre Neues Geistliches Lied and a translator of such songs. They were set to music by notable composers:

Selected works 
 "Abraham, Abraham, verlass dein Land" (EG 311)
 "Ein befreiendes Lied" (music: Ludger Stühlmeyer) (youth music festival at Clemenswerth 1992)
 "Frieden und Shalom" (melody from Israel)
 "Im Dunkel unsrer Ängste" (MG 296)
 "Kommt herbei, singt dem Herrn" (melody from Israel, GL 140)
 "Lass uns den Weg der Gerechtigkeit gehen" (music: Cristóbal Halffter Jiménez) (MG 490)
 "Lobt und preist die herrlichen Taten" (music: Lucien Deiss) (EG 429)
 "Mädchen du in Israel" (music by Albe Vidakovic)
 "Pilger sind wir Menschen" (after the melody of "Land of Hope and Glory" by Edward Elgar)
 "Sag ja zu mir, wenn alles nein sagt" (music by Ignace de Sutter, 1959, GL Austria 815 and other regional sections)
 "Seht ihr unsern Stern dort stehen" for Epiphany
 "Wir haben Gottes Spuren festgestellt" (music: Jo Akepsimas, MG 406)
 "Wir preisen deinen Tod" (music: Michael Ambroise Wackenheim, 1986, GL different regional sections)

References 

German Roman Catholic hymnwriters
German Dominicans
1935 births
Living people
20th-century German non-fiction writers
20th-century German translators
21st-century German writers
21st-century translators
People from Bottrop
20th-century German male writers
German male non-fiction writers